Prevention of type 2 diabetes can be achieved with both lifestyle changes and use of medication. The American Diabetes Association categorizes prediabetes as a high-risk group that has glycemic levels higher than normal but does not meet criteria for diabetes. Without intervention people with prediabetes progress to type 2 diabetes with a 5% to 10% rate. Diabetes prevention is achieved through weight loss and increased physical activity, which can reduce the risk of diabetes by 50% to 60%.


Lifestyle
Many interventions to promote healthy lifestyles have been shown to prevent diabetes. A combination of diet and physical activity promotion through counselling and support programs decrease weight, improve systolic blood pressure, improve cholesterol levels and decrease risk of diabetes.

Increasing physical activity may be helpful in preventing type 2 diabetes, particularly if undertaken soon after a carbohydrate rich meal that increases blood sugar levels. The American Diabetes Association (ADA) recommends maintaining a healthy weight, getting at least  hours of exercise per week (several brisk sustained walks appear sufficient), having a modest fat intake (around 30% of energy supply should come from fat), and eating sufficient fiber (e.g., from whole grains).

Numerous clinical studies have shown that resistant starch increases insulin sensitivity independent of the glycemic response of the food and may reduce the risk of type 2 diabetes. The U.S. Food and Drug Administration requires claims that resistant starch can reduce the risk of type 2 diabetes to be qualified with a declaration that scientific evidence in support of this claim is limited.

Foods with low glycemic index rich in fiber and other important nutrients are recommended notwithstanding insufficient evidence.

Study group participants whose "physical activity level and dietary, smoking, and alcohol habits were all in the low-risk group had an 82% lower incidence of diabetes".

Various sources suggest an influence of dietary fat types. Positive effects of unsaturated fats have been asserted on theoretical grounds and observed in animal feeding studies. Hydrogenated fats are universally considered harmful mainly because of well known effect on cardiovascular risk factors.

There are numerous studies which suggest connections between some aspects of type 2 diabetes with ingestion of certain foods or with some drugs. Breastfeeding may also be associated with the prevention of type 2 diabetes in mothers.

There is evidence relating consumption of coffee with prevention of type 2 diabetes. However, it is unclear if coffee causes any change in the risk of diabetes. This is true regardless of if it is caffeinated/decaffeinated; with/without sugar, or potboiled or not.

Medications
Some studies have shown delayed progression to diabetes in predisposed patients through prophylactic use of metformin, rosiglitazone, or valsartan. Lifestyle interventions are, however, more effective than metformin alone at preventing diabetes regardless of weight loss, though evidence suggests that lifestyle interventions and metformin together can be effective treatment in patients who are at a higher risk of developing diabetes.

Many other medications are well known to modify risk of diabetes 2 although in most cases they are prescribed for reasons unrelated to diabetes 2. In patients on hydroxychloroquine for rheumatoid arthritis, incidence of diabetes was reduced by 77% though causal mechanisms are unclear. Dopamine receptor agonists are also known to improve glycemic control, reduce insulin resistance and help controlling body weight.

Programmes 
Several countries established more and less successful national diabetes programmes to improve prevention and treatment of the disease. In the UK the NHS's diabetes prevention programme Healthier You offers personalised face-to-face and digital services. Assessment of the programme is ongoing but based on the first 36000 patients it seems that those who complete the programme manage to reduce their blood sugar levels and lose weight. At the same time only 1 in 5 people complete the whole 9-month programme.

References

Diabetes
Medical conditions related to obesity